Sunakozawa Dam is a gravity dam located in Akita Prefecture in Japan. The dam is used for flood control and water supply. The catchment area of the dam is 17 km2. The dam impounds about 44  ha of land when full and can store 8650 thousand cubic meters of water. The construction of the dam was started on 1985 and completed in 2010.

References

Dams in Akita Prefecture
2010 establishments in Japan